Rapatea is a group of plants in the family Rapateaceae described as a genus in 1845.

The genus is native to Panama, Trinidad, and northern South America.

 Species

References

Poales genera
Rapateaceae